Stockings by the Fire is a holiday compilation album released in November 2007 in the United States through Starbucks' record label Hear Music. In the United States, the album reached a peak position of number 34 on the Billboard 200 and number four on Billboard Top Independent Albums chart.

Track listing
 "Baby, It's Cold Outside", performed by Ray Charles (originally by Frank Loesser, 1944)
 "I Heard the Bells on Christmas Day", performed by Sarah McLachlan (originally by Henry Wadsworth Longfellow, 1864)
 "I'll Be Home for Christmas (If Only in My Dreams)", performed by Frank Sinatra (originally by Walter Kent, 1943)
 "Have Yourself a Merry Little Christmas", performed by Hem (originally by Hugh Martin and Ralph Blane, 1944)
 "Sleigh Ride", performed by Ella Fitzgerald (originally composed by Leroy Anderson, lyrics by Mitchell Parish)
 "What Are You Doing New Year's Eve?", performed by Rufus Wainwright (originally by Frank Loesser)
 "River", performed by Herbie Hancock (originally by Joni Mitchell)
 "Rudolph the Red-Nosed Reindeer", performed by Jack Johnson (originally by Johnny Marks)
 "Carol of the Bells", performed by The Bird and the Bee (originally by Mykola Leontovych, 1916)
 "Let It Snow", performed by A Fine Frenzy (originally by Sammy Cahn and composer Jule Styne, 1945)
 "The Christmas Song (Merry Christmas to You)", performed by Nat King Cole (originally by Mel Tormé and Bob Wells, 1944)
 "I've Got My Love to Keep Me Warm", performed by Dean Martin (originally by Irving Berlin, 1937)
 "Winter Wonderland", performed by Diana Krall (originally by Felix Bernard and Richard B. Smith, 1934)
 "Do You Hear What I Hear?", performed by Mahalia Jackson
 "It Don't Have to Change", performed by John Legend
 "White Christmas", performed by Aimee Mann (originally by Irving Berlin)

Personnel

 Leroy Anderson – composer
 Irving Berlin – composer
 Felix Bernard – composer
 The Bird and the Bee – primary artist
 Betty Carter – primary artist
 Ray Charles – primary artist
 Nat King Cole – primary artist
 A Fine Frenzy – primary artist
 Ella Fitzgerald – primary artist
 Herbie Hancock – primary artist
 Hem – primary artist
 Mahalia Jackson – primary artist
 Jack Johnson – primary artist
 Timothy Jones – compilation producer
 Diana Krall – primary artist
 Johnny Legend – primary artist
 Mykola Dmytrovich Leontovich – composer
 Aimee Mann – primary artist
 Johnny Marks – composer
 Dean Martin – primary artist
 Robert May – composer
 Sarah McLachlan – primary artist
 Joni Mitchell – composer
 Corinne Bailey Rae – primary artist
 Frank Sinatra – primary artist
 The Stevens Family – primary artist
 Steven Stolder – liner notes
 Rufus Wainwright – primary artist
 Robert Wells – composer
 Peter J. Wilhousky – composer

Credits adapted from Allmusic.

Charts
In the United States, Stockings by the Fire reached peak positions of number 34 on the Billboard 200 and number four on Billboard Top Independent Albums chart.

Weekly charts

Year-end charts

References

2007 Christmas albums
2007 compilation albums
Christmas compilation albums
Hear Music compilation albums